Thomas Trelor (29 October 1846 – unknown) was an English first-class cricketer active 1866–72 who played for Middlesex. He was born in St Austell.

References

1846 births
English cricketers
Middlesex cricketers
Year of death missing